Danafungia is a genus of mushroom corals in the family Fungiidae. Members of the genus are found growing on reefs in the Indo-Pacific.

Species
The World Register of Marine Species currently lists the following species:
Danafungia horrida (Dana, 1846)
Danafungia scruposa (Klunzinger, 1879)

References

Fungiidae
Scleractinia genera